The Authentic Adventures of Professor Thompson (Spanish: Las Autenticas Aventuras del Profesor Thompson) is a hand-drawn cartoon series produced by Federal Animation Picture and Televisión Española. It has also been translated and broadcast in England (on Channel 4), France (La Cinquième, Canal J), Germany (on RTL II), Poland (on TVP2, TV Polonia) and Sri Lanka (on Dynavision).

Plot
Professor Thompson stumbles on to an Egyptian Pharaoh Apestophis who has travelled forward in time with a miniature pyramid-shaped time-travelling device. Thompson and his short Russian friend Boris subsequently agrees to help him get back to his time. Meanwhile, German explorer Frida von Krugen learns of the device and with the help of her flat-headed scientist husband Otto, tries to get it away from the pharaoh. Trouble ensures as the struggle over the pyramid takes them to various points in history.

Cast and production
Music - Eduardo Armenteros
Story Board - Marcano, Almela, and Valentin Domenech
Voice Director - Luis Lorenzo
Professor Thompson (voice - Spanish) - Francisco Portes
Boris (voice - Spanish) - Ángel De Andrés
Frida von Krugen (voice - Spanish) - Julia Trujillo
Otto von Krugen (voice - Spanish) - Narciso Ibáñez Menta
Apestophis (voice - Spanish) - Manolo Andrés
Sepis (voice - Spanish) - Ismael Abellan
Porotosis (voice - Spanish) - Jesús Prieto
Helga (voice - Spanish) - Luisa Armenteros
Peter (voice - Spanish) - Laila Ripoll
Lasagna (voice - Spanish) - Luis Lorenzo

References

External links
clip of intro in Spanish
clip of ending
French site about the show
translation of French site

1992 Spanish television series debuts
1994 Spanish television series endings
Spanish children's animated adventure television series
RTVE shows